Hilaree Nelson (December 13, 1972 – September 26, 2022) was an American ski mountaineer. She became the first woman to summit two 8000-meter peaks (Everest and Lhotse) in one 24-hour push on May 25, 2012. On September 30, 2018, Nelson and partner Jim Morrison made the first ski descent of the "Dream Line", the Lhotse Couloir from the summit. Lhotse is the 4th-highest mountain in the world and shares a saddle with Mount Everest.

Nelson was named one of "The 25 Most Adventurous Women of the Past 25 Years" by Men's Journal, as well as being named as one of National Geographics 2018 Adventurers of the Year.

Career
Nelson was born on December 13, 1972, in Seattle, where she grew up and started skiing at Stevens Pass at the age of three. She was a mother of two sons, and resided in Telluride, Colorado. She served as The North Face global athletic team captain. She was a team member on the 2012 Montana State University Everest Education Expedition. Nelson was a National Geographic Explorers grant recipient, a member of over 40 expeditions, and had first ski descents on Baffin and South Georgia Islands, Argentina, Kamchatka, Russia, and the Tetons.

Her writing has been featured in such publications as National Geographic Adventure, The Ski Journal, and the Outside Journal.

Notable accomplishments
 First ski descent of the Dream Line (from summit), Lhotse Couloir, Nepal, 2018
 First ski descent of Papsura, India, 2017 
 First female descent of Makalu La Couloir, Nepal, 2015
 First to ski all five "Holy Peaks", Mongolian Altai
 First female to climb Everest and Lhotse in 24 hours, Nepal, May 25, 2012
 Skied from the summit of Cho Oyu, Tibet, September 22, 2005
 Skied from the summit of Denali, Messner Couloir, USA, June 16, 2011
 First female descent of Bubble Fun Couloir, Tetons, USA
 European Women's Extreme Skiing Champion, 1996

Advocacy
 Part of the "She Moves Mountains" campaign between The North Face and Girl Scouts of the USA

Death
Initial rescue efforts were hampered by bad weather, but on September 28, her body was located above the Thulagi glacier on the south face of Mount Manaslu, and was flown to Kathmandu by rescuers.

Nelson's body was cremated in Kathmandu on October 2, 2022.

Filmography
 Lhotse
 Down to Nothing 
 The Denali Experiment (2011, 15 min, directed by Jimmy Chin and Renan Ozturk)
 Fine Lines (2018, 96 min)
 K2: The Impossible Descent (2020, 65 min)

Accolades
 Named one of "The Most 25 Adventurous Women of the Past 25 Years" by Men's Journal.
 Named one of National Geographics 2018 Adventurers of the Year

See also
 List of ski descents of eight-thousanders

References

External links

1972 births
2022 deaths
American female ski mountaineers
Colorado College alumni
Mountaineering deaths in Nepal
People from Telluride, Colorado
Sportspeople from Seattle